Bracon is a hamlet in North Lincolnshire, England. Bracon lies within the Isle of Axholme and the civil parish of Belton, a village to the north to which the hamlet is conjoined.

Villages in the Borough of North Lincolnshire